The Testament of Sister New Devil is an anime series adapted from the light novels of the same title by Tetsuto Uesu and Nekosuke Ōkuma. Produced by Production IMS and directed by Hisashi Saito with Takao Yoshioka acting as series organizer, it was broadcast on Tokyo MX from January 7, 2015 to March 25, 2015, and it later continued with the second season from October 9, 2015 to December 11, 2015. The series follows the adventures of Basara Tojo, a young man who befriends Mio Naruse and Maria Naruse, who become like his sisters. After performing a master-slave magical contract with Basara becoming the master to the girls around him, Basara must help defend Mio from the demon and hero clans. The first anime series adapts material from the first three light novels. The first DVD and Blu-ray Disc compilation was released in Japan on March 27, 2015 by Kadokawa Shoten, with individual volumes being released monthly until August 28, 2015 for a total of six volumes.

In March 2015, the first season's twelfth episode announced that a second season would continue broadcasting in Japan in October. The season is titled The Testament of Sister New Devil BURST and it adapts Uesu and Ōkuma's light novels from the fourth through the seventh volumes. The series follows Basara Tojo, Mio Naruse, Maria Naruse, Yuki Nonaka, Kurumi Nonaka, and Zest participating in a tournament in the Demon Realm to protect Mio. The first DVD and Blu-ray compilation of BURST was released on December 25, 2015 by Kadokawa Shoten, with individual volumes being released monthly.

The background music for the series was composed by Yasuharu Takanashi. For the first season, two pieces of theme music were used. The opening theme, titled "Blade of Hope", is performed by the voice actress unit sweet ARMS. The ending theme is "Still Sis" performed by Kaori Sadohara. For the second season, two pieces of theme music were used. The opening theme is "Over The Testament", performed by Metamorphose, a unit consisting of singers Yoko Ishida, Kaori Oda, Aki Misato and Megumi Ogata. 5 versions of the song are played over the 11 episodes, with Yoko Ishida singing Ver.1, Kaori Oda singing Ver.2, Aki Misato singing Ver.3, Megumi Ogata singing Ver.4 and the group singing Ver.5. The ending theme is "Temperature" performed by Dual Flare, a duo consisting of singer Yuki Yamada and voice actress Natsumi Yamada.

A first OVA episode was released on June 22, 2015. A second OVA episode was released on January 26, 2016. A third OVA episode was released on March 28, 2018. The third OVA was Production IMS' final production before the company closed on October 11, 2018.

Episode list

The Testament of Sister New Devil

The Testament of Sister New Devil BURST

OVA

Notes

References

Lists of anime episodes